Prema Khaidi ( Love prisoner) is 1990 Indian Telugu-language romantic film directed by E. V. V. Satyanarayana starring Harish Kumar, Malashri, Sharada. It was the first hit film of E. V. V. Satyanarayana. The film was remade in Hindi as Prem Qaidi in 1991 with Harish Kumar and Karishma Kapoor. It was also remade in Kannada with the same name starring Vijay Raghavendra.

Plot 
The film begins with Chandram entering jail upon conviction of murdering his own father. He starts drawing the picture of a girl on the walls of his cell. When the jailor notices this and makes some obscene comments on the girl, Chandram confronts him. The jailor severely beats him up and imprisons him in an isolated cell. Meanwhile, a new Superintendent, Prabhavati takes charge of the jail. A girl named Neelima comes to visit Chandram, but the police do not allow her in. When he sees her, he escapes to meet her. But Neelima's servants try to grab her along with them. Chandram follows their vehicle. Police think that he is escaping and open fire, he gets injured. Prabhavati sends him to the hospital for treatment. In the hospital, some goons try to kill him before Prabhavati comes and thwarts their attempt. When Prabhavati inquires about the incident, he narrates his story.

Chandram's father used to work for Bapineedu. He loses both his legs when trying to save Bapineedu in an accident. Chandram's father requests Bapineedu to give him some job to earn a livelihood, to which he reluctantly agrees. Chandram meets Neelima in her birthday party and spoils her plan to fool her friends. She bets with her friends that she would make him love her. She tries to tease him many times, but Chandram tries to be within his limits, knowing the difference of the status of their families. Once, Neelima forces him to drink alcohol and Bapineedu thinks that he is misbehaving with his daughter. He is thrown out of the house, but does not utter a word of complaint about her. This made her realize that she is in true love with him. She seeks the permission of her father to marry Chandram. Bapineedu pretends to accept their love and secretly sends his goons to kill Chandram. They ended up killing Chandram's father and put the blame on Chandram. Prabhavati is moved by his story and promises him to help to win his love.

Cast
 Harish Kumar as Chandran "Chandu"
 Malashri as Neelima
 Sharada as Prabhavati
 P. L. Narayana as Chandram's father
 Gokina Rama Rao as Bapineedu
 Jayaprakash Reddy as K. K. Rao
 Giri Babu as Prabhavati's husband
 Tyagaraju as Bapineedu's henchman
 Brahmanandam as priest
 Babu Mohan as Devudayya
 Ali as Prisoner
 Uttej as Prisoner
 Prudhviraj
 Rajitha as Neelima's friend
 Ironleg Sastri as assistant priest
 Jenny as Registrar of marriages

Soundtrack

Awards
Malashri won Nandi Award for Best Supporting Actress (1990)

References

External links
 

1990 romantic drama films
1990 films
Films directed by E. V. V. Satyanarayana
Films scored by Rajan–Nagendra
Indian prison films
Films set in prison
Telugu films remade in other languages
Indian romantic drama films
1990s Telugu-language films
Suresh Productions films